Super ultra-low emissions vehicle (SULEV) is a U.S. classification for passenger vehicle emissions. The classification is based on producing 90% fewer emissions than the average gasoline-powered vehicle. The SULEV standard is stricter than the standard for LEV (low emission vehicle) and ULEV (ultra-low-emission vehicle), however not as strict as PZEV (partial zero-emissions vehicle) which meets the SULEV standard for tailpipe emissions, but has zero instead of reduced evaporative emissions. Japan also offers an SU-LEV classification, for vehicles that show a 75 percent reduction in emissions vis-à-vis the 2005 emissions standards.

Examples

Examples of vehicles delivering SULEV emissions performance include:
Honda Accord 2000-?
Honda Insight (CVT transmission models only) 
Honda Civic Hybrid CVT transmission models only, AT-PZEV available in certain states 
 Honda Civic GX Natural Gas 
 Honda CR-Z (AT-PZEV)
Toyota Prius
Ford Focus SULEV
 BMW SULEV 128i, 328i, 325i, 325Ci, and 325iT
Subaru PZEV Vehicles beginning with 2008 year models including Forester, Outback, Impreza and Legacy
Chevrolet Volt
Hyundai Elantra
Lexus CT200h
Honda Clarity PHEV 2018 - LEV3-SULEV20
Kia Forte
Volkswagen Jetta
Mini Cooper Hardtop 4-Door
Toyota RAV4 Hybrid
Pontiac Grand Prix, 3800 V6 equipped vehicles beginning with the 2005 model year
Toyota Highlander Hybrid
Chrysler Pacifica Hybrid
Volvo S80 PZEV

Tax incentives

In California, manufacturers of SULEVs can be given a partial credit for producing a zero-emission vehicle (ZEV) and so a vehicle of this type can be administratively designated as a partial zero-emissions vehicle (PZEV).  In order to qualify as a PZEV, a vehicle must meet the SULEV standard and, in addition, have zero evaporative emissions from its fuel system plus a 15-year/ warranty on its emission-control components.

In the case of hybrid vehicles this warranty is extended to the electric propulsion components (electric motor/generator/starter, battery, inverter, controls) and their mechanical interface to the driveline.

See California AB 1493 .

See also 
 US emission standard
 Automaker
 California Air Resources Board
 Car dealership
 Ultra-low-emission vehicle
 Partial zero-emissions vehicle
 Zero-emission vehicle

References

External links

 
 
 

Emission standards
Partial zero-emissions vehicles
Super ultra-low emission vehicles
Standards of the United States